is a Japanese voice actor affiliated with 81 Produce.

Voice roles
Bakumatsu Kikansetsu Irohanihoheto (Koma no Shouten-sama)
Blue Submarine No.6 (Kouichi Nakamura)
Galaxy Angel (Kryzman)
Genesis Survivor Gaiarth (Bangor III (Ep.1))
Parasol Henbe (Senbee)
Mobile Suit Gundam - The Movie Trilogy (Elran (Special Edition))
O-bake no... Holly (Chocola-jiisan)
Petite Princess Yucie (Drago)
Rurouni Kenshin (Kaishu Katsu (ep. 79–82))

Dubbing
The Rescuers (Gramps)
Robin Hood (Little John)

External links

References

81 Produce voice actors
Japanese male voice actors
Living people
Male voice actors from Hyōgo Prefecture
1930 births